Promesa, or variants, may refer to:

PROMESA, Puerto Rico Oversight, Management, and Economic Stability Act 
Promesa (album), album by Guardian
Promesas, album by  José José 1985 
Promesas (es), album by  Rosa López (2008)
La Promesa, album by Justin Quiles 2016
La Promesa Foundation, radio network
La promesa (es), Colombian TV series starring Julieth Restrepo
La promesa (es), fantastic story by Gustavo Adolfo Bécquer